NIC Inc. is a digital government service provider for federal, state and local governments in the United States. It was founded in 1992 and is headquartered in Olathe, Kansas. Harry H. Herington serves as the chief executive officer and chairman of the board. As Digital Government provider, NIC Inc. has long-term contracts with over 3,500 state and local government and federal agencies to provide the IT software, services, and payment processing solutions. 

NIC announced in February 2021 its plan to be acquired by Tyler Technologies. The acquisition completed in April 2021.

Background
The company has two primary segments including digital government software & services and payment processing solutions. The main service of the digital governmental solutions and services segment is providing out-sourced state eGovernment portals. Additionally, the other segment is engaged in developing payment processing solutions for state, local and federal governments. NIC Federal generates revenue from a contract with Federal Motor Carrier Safety Administration for the development and management of their online Pre-employment Screen Program presence.

Acquisitions 
In 2018, NIC acquired Leap Orbit, a prescription drug-monitoring program (PDMP).

In 2019, NIC acquired Complia, a Centennial, Colorado-based technology platform for government regulated cannabis.

Recognition 
In 2013, Forbes listed it as one of America's Best Small Companies. 

On February 24, 2014, The company's pre-employment screening program (PSP) customer service team was awarded a Bronze Stevie Award for supporting for the U.S. Department of Transportation Federal Motor Carrier Safety Administration (FMCSA).

In 2014 and 2015, NIC was named one of Kansas City's Healthiest Employers. 

In 2017, CFO Steve Kovzan was recognized as a CFO of the Year by the Kansas City Business Journal.

References

External links
 

E-government in the United States
Information technology consulting firms of the United States
Consulting firms established in 1992
American companies established in 1992
1992 establishments in Kansas
Companies formerly listed on the Nasdaq
2021 mergers and acquisitions
Companies based in the Kansas City metropolitan area
American corporate subsidiaries